Sri Venkateswara College is a constituent college of the University of Delhi..

Sri Venkateswara College may refer to:

 Sri Venkateswara College of Engineering, Tirupati, an engineering college in Tirupati, Andhra Pradesh
 Sri Venkateswara College of Engineering, Pennalur, Sriperumbudur near Chennai
 Sri Venkateswara College of Engineering and Technology, Tiruvallur
 Sri Venkateswara Junior College, Kamavarapukota, West Godavari District, Andhra Pradesh
 Sri Venkateswara Hindu College Of Engineering, Machilipatnam, an unaided institution in Machilipatnam, Andhra Pradesh
 Shree Venkateshwara Hi-Tech Engineering College, Gobichettipalayam, Tamil Nadu
 Sri Venkateshwara College of Engineering, Bangalore

See also
 Venkateshwara Institute of Technology, Meerut